When Men Hate is a 1913 American silent film produced by Gene Gauntier Feature Players and distributed by Warner's Features. It was directed by Sidney Olcott with Gene Gauntier and Jack J. Clark in the leading roles.

Cast
 Gene Gauntier - Ruth Morrisson
 Jack J. Clark - Donald Weston
 Alfred Hollingsworth - Jem Morrison

Production notes
 The film was shot in Jacksonville, Florida.

External links

 When Men Hate website dedicated to Sidney Olcott

1913 films
Silent American drama films
American silent short films
Films shot in Jacksonville, Florida
Films directed by Sidney Olcott
1913 short films
1913 drama films
American black-and-white films
1910s American films